The 54th Division was one of the divisions of the People's Army of the Republic that were organized during the Spanish Civil War on the basis of the Mixed Brigades. It came to operate on the Levante front.

History
During 1937, on the Northern Front there had already been a division that used this numbering.

In the spring of 1938, within the IX Army Corps, a division was created that was numbered "54". Its first commander-in-chief was Lieutenant Colonel Martín Calvo Calvo. It was made up of the newly created 180th, 181st and  182nd mixed brigades. Some time later it was sent to the Levante front, where it was included in the XIII Army Corps. It participated in the fighting in the Levante, resisting the nationalist offensive against Valencia. During the operations, the unit had an outstanding performance, coming to be congratulated by the republican authorities. On August 11, 1938, command of the unit passed to the anarchist Francisco Fervenza Fernández. During the rest of the war the unit remained inactive on the Levante front.

Command 
 Commanders
 Martín Calvo Calvo;
 Francisco Fervenza Fernández;

 Commissars
 Eleuterio Dorado Lanza, of the IR;

 Chiefs of Staff
 José García Benedito;
 Gonzalo Castelló Gómez-Trevijano;

Organization

Notes

References

Bibliography
 
 
 
 
 

Military units and formations established in 1937
Military units and formations disestablished in 1937
Military units and formations established in 1938
Military units and formations disestablished in 1939
Divisions of Spain
Military units and formations of the Spanish Civil War
Military history of Spain
Armed Forces of the Second Spanish Republic